Daniel Cleary (born 9 March 1996) is an Irish professional footballer who plays as a defender for Shamrock Rovers. His previous clubs are Liverpool, Birmingham City, Solihull Moors, Dundalk and St Johnstone.

Club career

Early career
Cleary grew up in Drimnagh, Dublin and played for local side Crumlin United at schoolboy level, the club that produced several international players including Robbie Keane. Aged 14 he had a trial with Birmingham City, but wasn't signed. He signed for Liverpool's Academy in 2011, aged 15.

Liverpool
Cleary made his Liverpool first team debut on 2 August 2015 in a pre-season friendly against Swindon Town, coming off the bench in the 57th minute replacing Trent Alexander-Arnold at right back in a 2–1 win at the County Ground. On 17 September 2015 Cleary's first involvement in a first team squad for a competitive match came when was included in the squad by Brendan Rodgers for a UEFA Europa League game away to Bordeaux but remained an unused substitute. During his time at Liverpool, he was deliberately injured by teammate Tom Brewitt in training, with Brewitt later owning up to doing so with the hopes of getting into the first team for an FA Cup tie and Cleary being ahead of him in the pecking order for centre backs. Cleary opted to leave the club in 2016 after 5 years at the club.

Birmingham City
Cleary signed for EFL Championship club Birmingham City on 27 July 2016. Cleary played for the club's reserve side up until the summer of 2017 when we was loaned out. On 19 January 2018, after returning from his loan at Solihull Moors, Birmingham announced that Cleary had left the club by mutual consent, later admitting that he had fell out of love with the game at that time.

Solihull Moors
On 26 July 2017, Cleary sealed a loan move to National League side Solihull Moors until 2 January 2018, alongside Birmingham teammate Connal Trueman. He made a total of 3 appearances during his time at the club.

Dundalk
Cleary signed for League of Ireland Premier Division club Dundalk on 15 February 2018. He scored his first goal in professional football on 2 June 2018 in a 5–2 win away to Shamrock Rovers and received a booking for celebrating the goal in front of Rovers manager Stephen Bradley in reference to not signing him after he had spent time on trial at the club in the month prior to joining Dundalk. Cleary won the first trophy of his career on 5 October 2018, as his side clinched the 2018 League of Ireland Premier Division with a 1–1 draw against St Patrick's Athletic. On 4 November 2018, Cleary came on as a late substitute in the 2018 FAI Cup Final as his side beat Cork City 2–1 to win the FAI Cup at the Aviva Stadium, completing the league and cup double. He was named League of Ireland Player of the Month for August on 12 September 2019. 2 days later, he played the full 120 minutes of the 2019 League of Ireland Cup Final and scored in the penalty shootout as his side won 4–2 on penalties to win the League Cup. Cleary and Dundalk claimed back to back league titles on 23 September 2019, as they beat Shamrock Rovers 3–2 to clinch the title. Cleary missed a penalty in the 2019 FAI Cup Final penalty shootout as Dundalk were beaten on penalties by Shamrock Rovers at the Aviva Stadium. On 11 November 2019 he played in the final of the inaugural Champions Cup, as his side beat NIFL Premiership champions Linfield 7–1 on aggregate to win the trophy. On 1 October 2020, Cleary scored in a 3–1 win against KÍ of the Faroe Islands at the Aviva Stadium to seal qualification to the UEFA Europa League Group Stages. He featured in all 6 of the club's group games, playing at home and away against Arsenal, Rapid Vienna and Molde. On 6 December 2020, Cleary played the full 120 minutes as Dundalk beat Shamrock Rovers 4–2 after extra time to win the 2020 FAI Cup Final. On 12 March 2021, Cleary played the full game in the 2021 President of Ireland's Cup and scored his penalty in the shootout as Dundalk beat Shamrock Rovers 4–3 on penalties after a 1–1 draw to win the trophy at Tallaght Stadium. He missed all 6 of the club's UEFA Europa Conference League qualifiers during the 2021 season due to spending a long spell out with a  quadriceps tendon injury. On 4 November 2021, he scored an 86th-minute winner away to Drogheda United in the Louth Derby. Cleary's contract was up at the end of November 2021, with Scottish club St Johnstone reportedly interested in signing him.

St Johnstone
Cleary completed a move to Scottish Premiership side St Johnstone on 1 January 2022 on a 2-and-a-half-year contract. He made his debut for the club on 18 January 2022 in a 2–0 loss to Heart of Midlothian at Tynecastle Stadium. Cleary was released by St Johnstone in July 2022, with his manager Callum Davidson citing family reasons for the departure.

Shamrock Rovers
After leaving St Johnstone, Cleary signed a "multi-year deal" with Shamrock Rovers. He made his debut for the club on 29 July 2022, scoring in a 4–0 win over Bangor Celtic in the FAI Cup.

International career
Cleary has represented the Republic of Ireland at Under-15, Under-17, Under-18, Under-19 and Under-21 level.

Career statistics

Honours

Club
Dundalk
League of Ireland Premier Division (2): 2018, 2019
FAI Cup (2): 2018, 2020
League of Ireland Cup (1): 2019
President of Ireland's Cup (2): 2019, 2021
Champions Cup (1): 2019
Shamrock Rovers
League of Ireland Premier Division (1): 2022

Individual
League of Ireland Player of the Month (1): August 2019

References

Living people
1996 births
Republic of Ireland association footballers
Association football defenders
Association footballers from Dublin (city)
Liverpool F.C. players
Birmingham City F.C. players
Solihull Moors F.C. players
Dundalk F.C. players
St Johnstone F.C. players
Shamrock Rovers F.C. players
Republic of Ireland expatriate association footballers
Irish expatriate sportspeople in Scotland
Irish expatriate sportspeople in England
Expatriate footballers in Scotland
Expatriate footballers in England
National League (English football) players
League of Ireland players
Scottish Professional Football League players